The Aam Aadmi Party Punjab or AAP Punjab is the Punjab state wing of Aam Aadmi Party and a recognised state party in Punjab. It has members in the Punjab Legislative Assembly and Rajya Sabha (the upper house of the Indian parliament).

The AAP fielded 434 candidates in the 2014 Indian general election. In its debut in Punjab, four AAP candidates from Punjab won the election out of 13. Consequently, the AAP became a recognised state party in Punjab.

In the 2017 Punjab assembly election, the party formed an alliance with the Lok Insaaf Party giving it five seats. No CM candidate was declared before the elections. This AAP Alliance won 22 seats in total, two of which were won by the Lok Insaaf Party. AAP won 20 seats in the Punjab Assembly in its debut in the 2017 Punjab elections.

The AAP contested on all 117 seats in the 2022 Punjab Legislative Assembly election and won 92 seats, giving it a large majority. AAP MP Bhagwant Mann became the Chief Minister of Punjab.

2022 Rajya Sabha election

Former cricketer Harbhajan Singh , IIT professor Sandeep Pathak, educationist Ashok Kumar Mittal , industrialist Sanjeev Arora and Delhi MLA Raghav Chadha  were nominated by AAP for a six year term in Rajya Sabha starting 2022. All five of them were elected unopposed.

2022 Punjab Legislative Assembly election

In January 2021 Arvind Kejriwal announced that AAP would be contesting in 2022 Punjab Legislative Assembly election. Raghav Chadha was appointed AAP Punjab co-in-charge for the Punjab election. On 18 January 2022 Bhagwant Mann was chosen as AAP's candidate for the post of Chief Minister of Punjab for the 2022 Punjab Legislative Assembly election. The selection was done by polling from the public. AAP did not have any alliance partner in this election.

In March 2021, Delhi CM Arvind Kejriwal held a Kisaan Mahapanchayat at Bagha Purana in Moga district and began campaigning for elections. On 28 June 2021, Kejriwal announced in a speech in Chandigarh that 300 units of free electricity would be provided to all Punjabis if the party wins the election. On 30 September 2021, Kejriwal also announced that if AAP wins the election, his government would build Mohalla Clinics in Punjab that would provide free healthcare facilities. On 22 November 2021, Arvind Kejriwal announced that if AAP wins Punjab then 1,000 rupees will be given to every women above 18 years of age. In the 2022 elections AAP registered a landslide victory. AAP contested on all 117 seats in the 2022 Punjab Legislative Assembly election and won 92 seats, giving it a large majority. AAP MP Bhagwant Mann became the CM of Punjab.

Candidates 
CM candidate Bhagwant Mann contested from the Dhuri Assembly Constituency. Below is the full list of AAP candidates with the successful candidates marked in blue.

Leader in Legislative Houses

2017 Punjab Legislative Assembly election 
In December 2015, Aam Aadmi Party declared that it would contest the 2017 Punjab Legislative Assembly election. AAP which did not participate in the 2012 assembly election, but had fought 2014 Lok Sabha elections. Their 2014 General election performance translates to 33 assembly seats out of 117.

Alliance Partners 
In the 2017 Punjab assembly election, the party formed a coalition with the Lok Insaaf Party and gave it five seats to contest. No CM candidate was declared before the elections. This alliance was called the AAP Alliance and was represented on news channels as AAP+. The alliance won 22 seats in total, two of which were won by the Lok Insaaf Party. AAP won 20 seats in the Punjab Assembly in its debut in the 2017 Punjab elections. In March 2018, the Lok Insaaf Party broke the coalition due to differences.

List of winning candidates and runner up candidates

Leader in Legislative House (2017-2022)

General election, 2014 
 
The AAP fielded 434 candidates in the 2014 Indian general election, in which it did not expect to do well. It recognised that its support was based primarily in urban areas and that different strategies might be required for different regions of the country. The party pointed out that its funding was limited and that there were too many demands for local visits from Kejriwal. The intention was to field candidates in large numbers to maximise the likelihood of recognition as a national party by the Election Commission. The outcome was that four AAP candidates won, all from Punjab. Consequently, the AAP became a recognised state party in Punjab.

Elected MPs

Organisation

Convener
Convener (or chief/president) is a highest political post in the Punjab unit of Aam Aadmi Party, holds responsibilities for the success of Party in Punjab.

After 2014 Indian general election in Punjab on 29 August 2014, Sucha Singh Chhotepur was appointed as first convener of  Aam Aadmi Party's Punjab unit. He served till 24 August 2016. After him Gurpreet Singh Waraich appointed the new convener.

In 2017 Punjab Legislative Assembly election party performed less than the expectations and got 20 seats in Punjab Legislative Assembly. Due to this he was removed from the post and Bhagwant Mann appointed as new convener along with Aman Arora. They resigned from the post on 17 March 2018 due to the apology by Arvind Kejriwal to Bikram Singh Majithia. After Maan and Arora's resignation Balbir Singh was appointed co-convener (caretaker) of Punjab's unit on 21 March 2018.

On 31 January 2019 before General election Maan was appointed as the Punjab conveneger.

List of Conveners

Legislative Party leader
Legislative Party leader is a person who leads the elected members of the party in Punjab Legislative Assembly.  On 11 March 2022, Bhagwant Mann was elected as the leader of the AAP legislative party.

Deputy leader

List of AAP MPs from Rajya Sabha

Activities
In June 2021, MLA and deputy leader of the opposition in Punjab assembly, Saravjit Kaur Manuke held hunger strike along with AAP activists to protest against the inaction of the Punjab government in the payment of post-matric scholarship amount of Dalit students. AAP convener Bhagwant Mann said that the protest by AAP members had forced the Punjab government then led by CM Amarinder Singh to release the funds amounting to 200 crore as 40% share of the amount that Punjab government had to pay.

See also  
Politics of Punjab
Aam Aadmi Party

Notes

References

Aam Aadmi Party
Political parties in Punjab, India